The 17th Indiana Infantry Regiment, also known as 17th Indiana Mounted Infantry Regiment, was an infantry and mounted infantry regiment that served in the Union Army from 1863 to 1865 during the American Civil War. It served in West Virginia before being transferred to the Western Theater.

Service

The 17th Indiana was organized at Indianapolis, Indiana, and mustered on June 12, 1861, for an initial 3-year enlistment.

Initial infantry service

It left the state for Parkersburg, West Virginia, on July 1, 1861, and was subsequently attached to the District of the Kanawha until September, 1861. Cheat Mountain District, W. Va., to November, 1861. Governor Oliver P. Morton appointed John T. Wilder as the lieutenant colonel of the 17th Indiana Infantry Regiment three months after the regiment was organized. On March 2, 1862, Wilder became the regiment's colonel, replacing Milo Hascall, who became a general.

Conversion to mounted infantry

In December 1862, the regiments colonel, John T. Wilder was promoted to command of the 2nd Brigade, 5th Division, Center, XIV Corps, Army of the Cumberland. After fruitless attempts to chase down rebel cavalry raiders on foot, the brigade was converted to mounted infantry. At the same time, Wilder proposed to the regiments in the brigade the private purchase of repeating rifles. The regiment voted to go ahead with the conversion to mounted infantry and the purchase of the rifles. Along with the other regiments in the brigade, the 17th chose  Spencer repeating rifles, invented by Christopher Spencer, as their weapon.

The new increase in firepower that the Spencer gave, allowed the 17th and its brigade mates to see off numerically superior Confederate infantry and cavalry in several engagements. The weapon was estimated to allow the regiment to deliver five to seven times the firepower of muzzle-loading opponents.

Tullahoma campaign

After intense training and development of new tactics, the "Lightning Brigade" was ready for service. The mounted infantry proof of concept for the Army of the Cumberland occurred in their first mounted infantry action at the Battle of Hoover's Gap. Despite torrential rains, the 17th and its brigade gained the gap so quickly that they surprised and scattered surprised the Confederate 1st (3rd) Kentucky Cavalry Regiment, under Colonel J. Russell Butler at breakfast in front of the entrance of the gap. The 17th drove the enemy before it along the seven mile length of the gap until they were halted by four brigades of infantry and four batteries of guns at the southeastern exit. The massive superiority of firepower the 17th and its brethren had with the Spencers allowed them to entrench and hold the southern entrance against numerous assaults by numerically superior rebel infantry and artillery through the rainy day until the sodden remainder of the XIV Corps slogged to join them at their position.

Chickamauga campaign

With the Lightning Brigade, the 17th found itself detached from the XIV Corps to serve as a mobile reserve for all three of the Corps within the Cumberland. After playing a key role in the feint that forced Bragg from Chattanooga, the regiment raided, skirmished, and scouted through the summer into the Chickamauga Campaign. The brigade distinguished itself with its performance at Chickamauga. During the battle, it maintained integrity and discipline exacting high casualties on its attackers. After the battle, it retreated with the army to Chattanooga where it was besieged.

The performance of the brigade had demonstrated the value of mounted infantry, and Wilder and the regiments were commended. During the reorganization after Grant took command in the city, the brigade was broken up and the regiments were transferred to the Cavalry Corps. The 17th and the 98th Illinois Mounted Infantry were assigned to 2nd Brigade under Colonel Eli Long of the 2nd Division of the Cavalry Corps under Major General George Crook.

Post Chickamauga

On 1 October, the 17th joined the rest of the Cavalry Corps operating against Wheeler's rebel cavalry, then in the Sequatchie Valley. On 3 October in a night attack at Thompson's Cove, the regiment routed the 2nd Brigade of Kelly's Division, capturing a number of arms and the 2nd Kentucky Cavalry's colors The next day it drove more elements of Wheeler's horsemen out of McMinnville. Regaining contact with the enemy on 7 October beyond Shelbyville, the 17th drove the enemy from the field and into Parmington. When the rebels attempted to make a stand, the regiment charged and took three of Wheeler's guns, a great number of small arms, and 300 prisoners.
The regiment regrouped with the 998th Illinois in Huntsville, AL until 13 October, when it started in pursuit of enemy cavalry again.

Detailed service history

Its assignments are as follows:
 15th Brigade, Army of the Ohio, to January, 1862.
 15th Brigade, 4th Division, Army of the Ohio, January, 1862.
 15th Brigade, 6th Division, Army of the Ohio, to September, 1862.
 15th Brigade, 6th Division, 2nd Corps, Army of the Ohio, to November, 1862.
 1st Brigade, 1st Division, Left Wing 14th Army Corps, Army of the Cumberland, to December, 1862.
 2nd Brigade, 5th Division (Center), 14th Army Corps, to January, 1863.
 2nd Brigade, 5th Division, 14th Army Corps, to June, 1863.
 1st Brigade, 4th Division, 14th Army Corps, to October, 1863.
 Wilder's Mounted Brigade, Army of the Cumberland, to November, 1863.
 2nd Brigade, 2nd Cavalry Division, Army of the Cumberland, November, 1863.
 3rd Brigade, 2nd Cavalry Division, Army of the Cumberland, to October, 1864.
 1st Brigade, 2nd Division, Wilson's Cavalry Corps, Military Division Mississippi, to August, 1865.

Notable members

 Mordecai Davidson (1845–1940), professional baseball owner and manager
 John Davis (1838–1901), Medal of Honor recipient
 Milo Smith Hascall (1829–1904), Brigadier General
 Jacob G. Vail (1827–1884), brevet Brigadier General
 John T. Wilder (1830–1917), brevet Brigadier General

Notes

Bibliography

See also
 List of Indiana Civil War regiments
 Indiana in the Civil War
 

17
1861 establishments in Indiana
Military units and formations established in 1861
Military units and formations disestablished in 1865